Bruce Elder is a former all-SEC basketball forward for Vanderbilt University.
Lassiter high school (Marietta)

A transfer from Davidson College where he played his freshman year, Elder was named 1993 NCAA Academic All-American of the Year.  He was an integral part of the regional number 3 seed Commodores which were ranked as high as number 5 and reached the sweet 16 round of the 1993 NCAA Division 1 tournament.  During the regular season the team knocked off numbers 9 Louisville, 8 Arkansas, and top-ranked Kentucky during the regular season and Illinois 85–68 in the NCAAs before falling to Temple 59–67.  They finished with their all-time best record of 28–6 including an SEC regular season record of 14–2.

Both an intelligent and athletic player, Elder led the team in a number of different statistical categories during his career – rebounds during the 1990–91 and 1992–93 seasons, in field goal percentage in '92–93, block shots in '91–92 and '92–93, and steals in '90–91.  He was named All-SEC Second Team for '92–93 and Academic All-SEC for all his three years with the team.  He stands the Commodores 4th all-time leader in blocks per game with 0.6, 8th in assists per game with 3.05, 9th in field-goal percentage at 51.3%, and 10th in steals with 1.15.

Elder was drafted in the second round of the 1993 USBL college draft by the Atlanta Trojans.  Finishing Vanderbilt with a bachelor's degree in Political Science and an M.B.A., he went on to become Client director with iXL Inc. in Atlanta.

Sources
Memorial Gym Rats page

Year of birth missing (living people)
Living people
American men's basketball players
Davidson Wildcats men's basketball players
Place of birth missing (living people)
Basketball players from Atlanta
Vanderbilt Commodores men's basketball players